Mukim Serasa is a mukim in Brunei-Muara District, Brunei. The population was 16,173 in 2016. The mukim encompasses Muara Town, home to Muara Port, the country's only deepwater port.

Geography 
Mukim Serasa is the north-easternmost mukim in the district, its land border is only with Mukim Mentiri to the west; the rest are bounded by the South China Sea to the north and the Brunei Bay to the east and south.

There are several island bodies off the coast of Serasa and the two which are well-known include Pelong Rocks and Pulau Muara Besar. There are also two sand spits found on its coast: Pelumpong Spit, which is originally a spit but has become a narrow island when an artificial channel was cut to provide access to Muara Port; and Serasa Spit, an artificial spit.

Demographics 
As of 2016 census, the population of Mukim Serasa comprised 8,770 males and 7,403 females. The mukim had 2,946 households occupying 2,878 dwellings. The entire population lived in urban areas.

Villages 
The mukim encompasses the following village subdivisions:

Facilities

Education 
Pengiran Isteri Hajjah Mariam Secondary is the only secondary school within the mukim.

Meragang Sixth Form Centre, one of the few sixth form colleges in the country, is located in Kampong Meragang.

Mosques 
 Kampong Kapok Mosque
 Kampong Perpindahan Serasa Mosque
 Setia Ali Mosque

Places of interest
The coast of Serasa which borders the South China Sea is lined with the beaches of Meragang, Muara and Tanjong Batu and they have been designated as places of recreation for the public.

The coast of the artificial Serasa Spit is also lined with beach features. The area of this Serasa Beach has also been made into a public recreational area.

Brooketon Colliery is a disused coal mine. It was developed during the period of Charles Brooke's rule of Sarawak in the late 19th and early 20th centuries.

Muara Naval Base is home to the base of the Royal Brunei Navy.

References

Serasa
Brunei-Muara District